The 8th Sin is the eighth studio album by Swedish power metal group Nocturnal Rites, released by Century Media on 16 May 2007.

Track listing
All songs by Mannberg/Eriksson/Norberg.
"Call Out to the World" – 3:48 
"Never Again" – 3:19
"Not the Only" – 5:16
"Tell Me" – 4:13
"Not Like You" – 4:25
"Leave Me Alone" – 3:00
"Till I Come Alive" – 3:45
"Strong Enough" – 3:13
"Me" – 4:13
"Pain & Pleasure" – 3:53
"Fools Parade (Outro)" – 2:37
"My Self Destruction" - 3:39  (Japanese Bonus Track)
"Coming Home" - 3:52 (Bonus Track)

Personnel
 Jonny Lindkvist – vocals
 Fredrik Mannberg – guitar
 Nils Norberg – lead guitar
 Nils Eriksson – bass
 Owe Lingvall – drums

Guests and Additional Personnel

 Carolina Miskovsky - guest Vocals on Track 9
 Henrik Kjellberg - backing vocals, keyboard arrangements, orchestrations, background vocal arrangements
 Samuel Ljungblad - backing vocals
 Richard Frohm - piano on track 9
 Olec Batla - narration, percussion, salt marimba
 Jens Kidman - harsh vocals on track 10

References

2007 albums
Century Media Records albums
Nocturnal Rites albums